is a town located in Saitama Prefecture, Japan. , the town had an estimated population of 11,097 in 4494 households and a population density of 330 persons per km².

Geography
Located in western Saitama Prefecture, Misato is on the central reaches of the Arakawa River and is approximately 70 kilometers from downtown Tokyo.

Surrounding municipalities
Saitama Prefecture
 Fukaya
 Honjō
 Minano
 Nagatoro

Climate
Misato has a humid subtropical climate (Köppen Cfa) characterized by warm summers and cool winters with light to no snowfall.  The average annual temperature in Misato is 13.1 °C. The average annual rainfall is 1532 mm with September as the wettest month. The temperatures are highest on average in August, at around 24.7 °C, and lowest in January, at around 1.7 °C.

Demographics
Per Japanese census data, the population of Misato has remained relatively steady for a century.

History
Mastuhisa, Ozawa and Higashikodama villages were created within Naka District, Saitama with the establishment of the modern municipalities system on April 1, 1889. Naka District was abolished in 1896, becoming part of Kodama District. The three villages merged to form the village of Misato on October 1, 1954. Misato was elevated to town status on October 1, 1984.

Government
Misato has a mayor-council form of government with a directly elected mayor and a unicameral town council of 13 members. Misato, together with the city of Fukaya and the town of Yorii, contributes three members to the Saitama Prefectural Assembly. In terms of national politics, the town is part of Saitama 11th district of the lower house of the Diet of Japan.

Economy
Eisai has a pharmaceutical plant in Misato, which is a major local employer.

Education
Misato has three public elementary schools and one public middle school operated by the town government. The town does not have a high school.

Transportation

Railway
 JR East –  Hachikō Line

Highway

References

External links

Official Website 

Towns in Saitama Prefecture
Misato, Saitama (town)